Alexandrovka is a rural locality (a selo) and the administrative center of Alexandrovskoye Rural Settlement, Ternovsky District, Voronezh Oblast, Russia. The population was 634 as of 2010. There are 15 streets.

Geography 
Alexandrovka is located 52 km southwest of Ternovka (the district's administrative centre) by road. Kiselnoye is the nearest rural locality.

References 

Rural localities in Ternovsky District